The 2007 Harlow District Council election took place on 3 May 2007 to elect members of Harlow District Council in Essex, England. One third of the council was up for election and the council stayed under no overall control.

After the election, the composition of the council was
Conservative 12
Labour 12
Liberal Democrats 8
Independent 1

Background
After the last election in 2006 the Conservatives had 12 seats, Labour 11 and the Liberal Democrats 10. However, in January 2007 John Goddard left the Conservative group to sit as an independent, meaning that going into the 2007 election both the Conservative and Labour parties had 11 councillors.

12 seats were contested at the election, with 2 seats being available in Church Langley ward after Sam Warren stood down from the council.

Election result
The Liberal Democrats lost 2 seats to fall to 8 councillors, 1 each to the Conservative and Labour parties, who both finished with 12 councillors. The closest result came in Toddbrook ward where Labour held the seat with a 15-vote majority over the Conservatives, while both the Conservative and Liberal Democrat group leaders, Andrew Johnson and Chris Millington won seats in Church Langley and Bush Fair wards respectively. Overall turnout at the election was 34.75%, down from 36.93% in 2006.

Following the election a coalition between Labour and the Liberal Democrats continued to run the council.

Ward results

Bush Fair

Church Langley (2 seats)

Great Parndon

Harlow Common

Little Parndon and Hare Street

Mark Hall

Netteswell

Old Harlow

Staple Tye

Sumners and Kingsmoor

Toddbrook

By-elections between 2007 and 2008

Little Parndon and Hare Street
A by-election was held in Little Parndon and Hare Street on 25 October 2007 after the death of Labour councillor Jack Jesse. The seat was held for Labour by the former council leader Michael Danvers with a majority of 196 votes over the Conservatives.

Toddbrook
A by-election was held in Toddbrook ward on 25 October 2007 after the death of Labour councillor Roy Collyer. The seat was gained for the Conservatives by David Carter with a majority of 15 votes over Labour.

References

2007
2007 English local elections
2000s in Essex